The Centre for Mechanochemical Cell Biology (CMCB) is a research centre at the University of Warwick, specialising in quantitative, biophysical approaches to cell biology.
The Centre was founded by Robert Cross, Andrew McAinsh and Anne Straube when they relocated from the Marie Curie Research Institute in Oxted, Surrey, UK to Warwick Medical School.
It has expanded to become an inter-disciplinary centre with research groups led by principal investigators from Physics, Computer Science, Maths and Warwick Medical School.

Research groups in the centre focus on themes such as cell division, cytoskeleton, molecular motors and membrane traffic.
They are supported by Wellcome Trust, Cancer Research UK, Medical Research Council (United Kingdom) and Biotechnology and Biological Sciences Research Council.
Notable scientists in CMCB include Andrew McAinsh (2018 Hooke Medal Winner), Stephen Royle (2021 Hooke Medal Winner) and Anne Straube (Lister Institute Prize Fellow).
Many of the groups are located in the Mechanochemical Cell Biology Building on the Gibbet Hill Campus.
The building was opened in April 2012 by Nobel Prize laureate Paul Nurse. An extension to the building was subsequently built and opened by Nobel Prize winning cell biologist Randy Schekman in 2016.

During the COVID-19 pandemic, the virtual seminar series "Motors in Quarantine" was initiated by CMCB scientists led by Prof. Anne Straube.

Faculty
 there are 19 Group Leaders in the Centre.

Group Leaders:

Mohan Balasubramanian
Andrew Blanks
Andrew Bowman
Till Bretschneider
Nigel Burroughs
Robert Cross
Samuel Dean
Vasily Kantsler
Darius Koester
Andrew McAinsh
Masanori Mishima
Marco Polin
Aparna Ratheesh
Stephen Royle
Karuna Sampath
Timothy Saunders
Michael Smutny
Anne Straube
Matthew Turner

References

Biophysics organizations
Research institutes in Warwickshire
University of Warwick